The 2012–13 UMBC Retrievers men's basketball team represented the University of Maryland, Baltimore County during the 2012–13 NCAA Division I men's basketball season. The Retrievers, led by first-year head coach Aki Thomas, played their home games at the Retriever Activities Center and were members of the America East Conference. They finished the season 8–23, 5–11 in American East play to finish in a tie for seventh place. They advanced to the semifinals of the America East tournament where they fell to Vermont.

Roster

Schedule

|-
!colspan=9| Regular season

|-
!colspan=9|2013 America East tournament

References

UMBC
UMBC Retrievers men's basketball seasons
UMBC
UMBC